Craig Campbell is the debut studio album by the American country music artist of the same name. It features his debut single, "Family Man". The album was released on April 5, 2011 via Bigger Picture Music Group. As of the chart dated May 7, 2011, the album has sold 15,256 copies in the US. The album's second single, "Fish," was released to country radio on June 6, 2011.

Track listing

Personnel
Eddie Bayers - drums
Craig Campbell - lead vocals
Stuart Duncan - fiddle, mandolin
Paul Franklin - steel guitar
John Hobbs - piano, Wurlitzer
Brent Mason - electric guitar
Gary Prim - piano
John Wesley Ryles - background vocals
Bobby Terry - acoustic guitar
Glenn Worf - bass guitar

Chart performance

Album

Singles

References

2011 debut albums
Craig Campbell (singer) albums
Albums produced by Keith Stegall
Bigger Picture Music Group albums